Vikāra (Sanskrit:विकार) basically means – change, change of form, change of mind, disease. It is one of the ten categories of causation listed by Vasubandhu in his Madhyānta-Vibhāga-Bhāśya. In the Sanskrit texts, it is used in the Prātiśākhyas that introduce phonic substitutions by mentioning the substituted unit in the nominative ending and the substitute in the accusative ending.

According to the Sadvidyā (the science of being) of Uddālaka Āruni, dualistically all things that exist are differentiations, vikāras (transformations) of sat, the primordial being, who is the universal substrate; all things can be identified on account of nāmarūpa (distinct name and form). Purusha (Brahman) created all these multi-folds of Nature by transforming himself. This is the same as the Samkhya theory of causation, Satkaryavada, which is based on the premise that the effect is existent in the cause, and the original cause is Prakṛti composed of three  gunas which are tendencies and modes of operation. Prakrti is closely associated with the concept of Maya within Vedic scripture. The world is seen to be ever-evolving because vikāra (modification) is its svabhāva (nature); origination and dissolution are two vikāras, and causal efficiency is the power to initiate change. A change (vikāra) can take place only when there is action. Vivartavada of Advaita Vedanta involves apparent vikāra or modification, a mere illusion.

In Ayurveda, diseases produced by one dosha are known as nanatmaja-vikāra, those produced by more than one dosha are known as samanyaja-vikāra; these are not vyādhi-rogas but distinct and treatable disorders. Kāma (lust), Krodha (anger), Lobha (greed), Moha (deep emotional attachment, stupidity), Mātsarya (envy) and Madā (pride, wantonness) are the vikāras of the mind mentioned in the Bhagavad Gita.

References

Hindu philosophical concepts
Vedanta